The Steinruck SCS-1 is an American high-wing, single-seat, V-tailed glider that was designed by A.C. Cordas and constructed by Wade Steinruck.

Design and development
Steinruck worked on the SCS-1 for many years in his spare time at his home in Spring Valley, California, completing the aircraft in 1959.

The SCS-1 is built predominantly from aluminium. It features a V-tail and a three-piece wing with a NACA 33012 airfoil. The spoilers are located in a hatch that is behind the canopy.

Operational history
The SCS-1 has been flown on several recreational  out and return and triangle flights.

In June 2011 the aircraft was still registered with the Federal Aviation Administration to Steinruck, 52 years after its completion.

Specifications (SCS-1)

See also

References

1950s United States sailplanes
Homebuilt aircraft
Aircraft first flown in 1959
V-tail aircraft